The Freedom Alliance, abbreviated , is a Finnish registered party. The party received the required 5,000 signatures on 19 April 2022 and was registered on 6 May 2022.

Background
The background of several key people in the party is the Power Belongs to the People (VKK) party, led by Ano Turtiainen . Ossi Tiihonen, the chairman of the Freedom Alliance, was one of the prominent members of the VKK, and Cia Grönberg, the party secretary, was the director of VKK's membership in the 2022 regional elections.

All members and officials could not accept VKK's views on Russia's invasion of Ukraine in the spring of 2022. The position of the VKK was relatively pro-Russian and pro-Putin. According to Turtiainen, the reason was not related to appeasing Russia, but to the characteristics of the people who left the party: they were self-interested, the structure of the VKK was designed to prevent it, and the party conflict in the VKK disappeared with them.

Politicians
The party already has elected politicians at the time of its registration. Tiihonen, the chairman of the party and Lohja city councilor will move to the Freedom Alliance group, as will Grönberg and Heli Rämäkkö elected in the county elections.

The party intends to run in the 2023 parliamentary elections and nominated 19 candidates on May 4, 2022.

References

External links 

Eurosceptic parties in Finland
Finns Party breakaway groups
Opposition to NATO
Nationalist parties in Finland
Political parties established in 2022
Anti-vaccination organizations